The Best Film You've Never Seen: 35 Directors Champion the Forgotten or Critically Savaged Movies They Love is a book by the journalist and editor Robert K. Elder.

Synopsis
Published in 2013, the book features interviews with 35 directors about lesser-known movies that influenced them. This is the companion to his previous book, The Film That Changed My Life.

Interviews
The directors include:
John Woo (who've chosen Le Samouraï)
Danny Boyle (Eureka)
John Dahl (Twin Peaks: Fire Walk with Me)
Guillermo del Toro (Arcane Sorcerer)
Rian Johnson (Under the Volcano)
Jay Duplass (Joe Versus the Volcano)
Richard Linklater (Some Came Running)
John Waters (Boom!)
Kevin Smith (A Man for All Seasons)
Peter Bogdanovich (Trouble in Paradise)
Edgar Wright (The Super Cops)
Bill Condon (Sweet Charity)
Alex Proyas (The Swimmer)
Frank Oz (The Trial)

Reception
Reviews of the book have praised both Elder's interviewing style and the depth of information included in the book.

References

External links
Official Tumblr page
Amazon.com

2013 non-fiction books
Books about individual films
Books of interviews
Chicago Review Press books
American non-fiction books